Chris Dixon II (born November 15, 1981) is a former professional indoor football player. He is also a former head coach. He ended his long playing career with a stint as quarterback for the Tampa Bay Storm of the Arena Football League (AFL) before returning to the Sioux Falls Storm (IFL) near the end of their 2019 season. Dixon attended Contra Costa College for two years before attending Humboldt State University, where he was an All-conference player.

After failing to be drafted, Dixon played semi-professional outdoor football before becoming an indoor football player. In 2005, he made his professional debut with the Black Hills Red Dogs, playing both quarterback and wide receiver. Upon his release, Dixon signed with the Billings Mavericks, where he would play for 5 seasons, winning 3 championships and throwing 369 touchdowns. Upon the folding of the Billings franchise, Dixon signed with the Sioux Falls Storm, where he won two championships in as many seasons. In 2012, Dixon signed with the Orlando Predators, it was the first time in Dixon's career that he played arena football instead of indoor football.

Dixon is considered the greatest indoor football quarterback of all time, winning six championships, as well as the first indoor football player to throw for 500 career touchdowns. He was inducted into the Indoor Football League Hall of Fame in 2015.

College career
Dixon attended Contra Costa College for two years before attending Humboldt State University for his final two years of school.

Professional career

Oakland Vipers
Dixon played for the Oakland Vipers of the Golden State Amateur Football League for a single season, and he held the record for the most passing yards in a single game (471) as of 2005.

Eastside Hawks
Dixon began playing indoor football when he signed with the Eastside Hawks, who at the time were playing semi-professional in the North American Football League. He led the Hawks to a National Championship, while winning Championship Game MVP and league rookie of the year honors.

Black Hills Red Dogs
In 2005, Dixon signed with the Black Hills Red Dogs of United Indoor Football. While with the Red Dogs, Dixon played both quarterback and receiver for the Red Dogs, completing 59 of 114 passes for 493 yards with 5 touchdowns, while also having 12 receptions for 202 yards and 3 touchdowns. Dixon was traded to Billings.

Billings Mavericks/Outlaws
Dixon quickly signed with the Billings Mavericks of the National Indoor Football League, where he would split time with Bob Bees at quarterback during the remainder of the 2005 season. Dixon led the Outlaws to three championships (2006, 2009 & 2010) throughout his five seasons with the team.

Sioux Falls Storm
In 2012, Dixon threw his 500th career touchdown pass, when he hit James Terry with a 42-yard pass during a May 19 game against the Green Bay Blizzard. With his 500th touchdown, Dixon became the 10th player to throw for a 500th touchdown at any professional level.

Orlando Predators
Dixon has signed with the Orlando Predators of the Arena Football League for the 2013 season. Dixon was named the backup quarterback to Kyle Rowley to start the season. In the Predators first game, Dixon appeared in one play, a zone read play near the goalline, where Dixon was tackled for a 1-yard loss. Dixon didn't play again until the Predators' Week 3 game against the Philadelphia Soul. Dixon came in to replace the struggling Rowley, and completed 9 of 13 passes for 120-yards. Dixon also had 2 touchdown passes and one interception against the Soul. Dixon was released in late May.

New Orleans VooDoo
On May 30, 2013, Dixon was assigned to the New Orleans VooDoo. In Dixon's first game action with the VooDoo, he replaced starter Kurt Rocco, who was struggling against the San Antonio Talons' pass-rush. Dixon was able to evade defenders, running for 66-yards and did not get sacked once. Dixon took over trailing 21–6, and led the VooDoo to a 56–53 loss, after he was tripped up as he was attempting to make a pass on the final play of the game. Dixon's playing style caught the attention of many in the league. Dixon is one of the few players to ever play arena football out of the shotgun. Dixon's play helped the VooDoo fight to get back into the playoff picture for 2013.

Return to Sioux Falls
On January 6, 2014, it was announced that Dixon would be returning to the Storm, citing his desire to graduate from Augustana College and be close to his family as his reasons for return. After the 2014 season, Dixon announced his retirement as a player.

Coaching career
In late July 2014, the Billings Wolves of the Indoor Football League announced they had signed Dixon as head coach for their upcoming inaugural season.

In July 2022, Cactus Shadows High School in Scottsdale, AZ announced they had selected Coach Dixon to lead their football program.

References

External links
 Sioux Falls Storm profile

1981 births
Living people
Contra Costa Comets football players
Humboldt State Lumberjacks football players
Billings Outlaws players
Sioux Falls Storm players
Orlando Predators players
New Orleans VooDoo players
Tampa Bay Storm players
Richmond High School (Richmond, California) alumni